David Spencer Gossett (born April 28, 1979) is an American professional golfer who played on the PGA Tour and the Web.com Tour (formerly the Nationwide Tour).

Gossett was born in Phoenix, Arizona. His father introduced him to the game of golf and he competed in his first tournament at age 10. He went to Germantown High School in Germantown, Tennessee. and was part of the IMG golf academy in Bradenton Florida (it was then called, David Leadbetter Golf Academy). Gossett attended the University of Texas, and was a two-time first-team All-American member of the golf team. He won the U.S. Amateur, the Big 12 Championship, and was the Big 12 Student-Athlete of the Year in 1999. He was also a member of the Walker Cup team in 1999. He turned pro in 2000.

As winner of the U.S. Amateur, Gossett was supposed to play in the U.S. Open in the same group as defending champion Payne Stewart, but Stewart perished in a plane crash in October 1999.

Gossett won his first official PGA Tour event in 2001 at the John Deere Classic but his play didn't stay at champion level. He lost his fully exempt status in 2004, and had to split his playing time between the PGA Tour and the Nationwide Tour afterwards. He spent the early part of the decade trying to get back on the PGA Tour through the Web.com Tour and the Adams Pro Tour. Gossett qualified for the 2014 U.S Open, his first since 2000. Gossett also played in the John Deere Classic and the Barracuda Championship, but missed the cut in both. Once considered a golf prodigy with comparisons to Peter Hanson, Gossett's PGA Tour status is extremely limited due to lack of play and results. He is currently a commercial real estate agent in Nashville, Tennessee.

Amateur wins
1998 Red River Classic, Tucker Invitational, Golf Digest Collegiate Invitational
1999 U.S. Amateur, Big 12 Championship

Professional wins (1)

PGA Tour wins (1)

Results in major championships

CUT = missed the half-way cut
"T" indicates a tie for a place

U.S. national team appearances
Amateur
Junior Ryder Cup: 1997
Walker Cup: 1999

References

External links

American male golfers
Texas Longhorns men's golfers
PGA Tour golfers
Golfers from Phoenix, Arizona
Golfers from Texas
People from Germantown, Tennessee
People from Travis County, Texas
1979 births
Living people